Susanna J. Coffey (born 1949) is an American artist and educator. She is the F. H. Sellers Professor in Painting at the School of the Art Institute of Chicago and lives and works in New York City. She was elected a member the National Academy of Design in 1999.

Life
Coffey was born in New London, Connecticut in 1949. She received a Bachelor of Fine Art degree magna cum laude from the University of Connecticut in 1977 and a Master of Fine Arts degree from the Yale School of Art in 1982.

Coffey's work investigates normative values of beauty and gender asking questions like "What is a beautiful appearance? Why do conventionally gendered images involve caricature? Can inchoate feeling-states be adequately portrayed?"

Coffey is best known for her paintings of heads―often self-portraits, such as her Self Portrait, Versace (Canal) Scarf in the collection of the Honolulu Museum of Art.  Like many of her paintings, this 1996 self-portrait is a frontal view, lit from behind.  Hearne Pardee describes her practice in the Brooklyn Rail:

Collections

Coffey's work is held at a wide range of institutions, including Akron Art Museum in Akron, Ohio, Yale University Art Gallery, the Danforth Art Museum in Framingham MA, the Art Institute of Chicago in Chicago, the Brauer Museum of Art in Valparaiso, Indiana, the Davis Museum and Cultural Center at Wellesley College in Wellesley, Massachusetts, the Honolulu Museum of Art in Honolulu, Hawaii, the Minneapolis Institute of Arts in Minneapolis, Minnesota, the National Academy of Design in New York City, the Rockford Museum in Rockford, Illinois, the Weatherspoon Art Gallery in Greensboro, North Carolina and the Williams College Museum of Art in Williamstown, Massachusetts.

Awards
Susanna Coffey has received awards from the National Endowment for the Arts and the Louis Comfort Tiffany Foundation, a Guggenheim Fellowship, a residency at the Rockefeller Foundation Bellagio Center, and the Marie Walsh Sharpe Foundation Studio Program Award.

Further reading
 Book, Night Painting, Susanna Coffey  MAB Books, editor Brice Brown, a selection of landscape paintings with writings by Dr. Carol Becker, Brice Brown, Jane Coffey, Jane Kenyon, Jennifer Samet and Mark Strand  2019
 Book, 50 Contemporary Women Artists, editors John Goslee and Heather Zises, Schiffer Publishing, Ltd.,  2018
 Two Coats of Paint Interview with Sangram Majumdar
 Review of Elemental by Hearne Pardee The Brooklyn Rail February 2014
 Book, ″In Residence, Contemporary Artists at Dartmouth The Hood Museum of Art″, Dartmouth College, 2014
 Review of From Life  by John Yau, Hyperallergic November 25, 2012
 Review of Apophenia by Cate McQuaid, The Boston Globe, September 25, 2012
 Review of Nocturne by John Goodrich, City Arts April 3, 2012
 Review of Pavers, City Arts, John Goodrich, January 12, 2011
 Book, ″Selected Contemporary American Figurative Painters″, Editor, Qimin Liu, Tianjin Peoples Fine Arts Publishing House, China, 2010
 Review of Night Paintings 1995-2010, Jeremy Bliss, New City, Chicago, April 22, 2010
 Catalog, ″Artist’s Response: Portraits and Self-Portraits″, from exhibition, Unexpected Reflections: The Portrait Reconsidered at Meridian Gallery, 2009, San Francisco  CA, by Terri Cohn
 Review of Reconfiguring the Body in American Art, 1820-2009, The New York Times, Ken Johnson, July 22, 2009
 Article, “Looking at Herself” Kathleen Edgecomb, The New London Day, December 8, 05
 Review of Alpha Gallery show, Cate McQuaid, The Boston Globe, November 19, 2004 
 Review of Women of the Academy, Ken Johnson, The New York Times, Summer 2003
 Catalog, Susanna Coffey: Recent Work, Strand, Mark, New York, André Emmerich, 2003
 Catalog, Susanna Coffey, Tibor De Nagy Gallery, New York, Tibor De Nagy Gallery, 2001
 Catalog Susanna Coffey, Tibor De Nagy Gallery, 2001 essay by Michael Rooks, Poem, "In Sky" by Susan Wheeler
 Catalog, Susanna Coffey  Studio Art Exhibition Program, Dartmouth College, September, 1998 Essays by Michael Rooks and Eileen Myles

References

External links
 
 Artists Quarantined with Their Art,  Hyperallergic  June 20th 2020
  Interview with Erica Hess for the podcast I like Your Work  
 WYBC Radio Interview: Brainard Carey with Susanna Coffey
 Interview on Gorky's Granddaughter
 Hyperallergic conversation with Susanna Coffey
 Susanna Coffey on Pierre Bonnard
 Catalog from Susanna Coffey's “Going to Ground” at the University of Tulsa
 Why Give a Name to It? by John Yau in Hyperallergic
 An Interview of Susanna Coffey with Rich Fisher on Tulsa Public Radio
 Susanna Coffey Studies the Nature of Portraiture by John Yau in Hyperallergic
 4 Artists on Expressing Love Through Their Work on Artsy

1949 births
Living people
People from New London, Connecticut
American women painters
American portrait painters
Artists from New York City
Painters from Connecticut
21st-century American women artists
University of Connecticut alumni